The winner of the field hockey event of the Pan American Games qualifies for the Summer Olympics in the following year.

Women's field hockey was introduced at the 1987 edition, and has served as the Olympics qualifying event since 1999.

Men's tournament

Results

Summary

* = hosts

Team appearances

Women's tournament

Results

Summary

* = hosts

Team appearances

Medal table

Total

Men

Women

See also
Men's Pan American Cup
Women's Pan American Cup

External links
Pan American Games - Final Standings

 
Pan American Games
Sports at the Pan American Games
Pan American Games